Clinton Desmond Hinchliffe (born 23 October 1996) is an Australian cricketer. He is a left-handed batsman and left-arm unorthodox bowler. He made his List A debut for the National Performance Squad against Australia A on 16 August 2016. He also played in a tour match for the Western Australia XI against England prior to the 2017–18 Ashes series.

Domestic career
Hinchliffe played both cricket and Australian rules football growing up, being good enough in the latter to play for Western Australia in the 2015 AFL Under 18 Championships. He was named as one of his side's best players in their loss to Vic Metro. He also played juniors and WAFL reserves for West Perth.

Hinchliffe was in the Cricket Australia XI squad for the 2017–18 JLT One-Day Cup. He took his career best figures of 4/71 in the 11th match against New South Wales in a 93-run loss. He played all six matches for Cricket Australia XI, scoring 150 runs and taking 6 wickets, the most wickets of anyone in the squad.

He made his first-class debut for Western Australia in the 2017–18 Sheffield Shield season on 16 February 2018. He made his Twenty20 debut for the Perth Scorchers in the 2018–19 Big Bash League season on 1 February 2019.

References

External links

1996 births
Living people
Australian cricketers
Cricket Australia XI cricketers
Perth Scorchers cricketers
Cricketers from Perth, Western Australia
Western Australia cricketers
Melbourne Stars cricketers